Martin Bengtsson may refer to:
 Martin Bengtsson (musician), Swedish musician
 Martin Bengtsson (footballer) (born 1986), Swedish footballer